Abrotanella is a genus in the family Asteraceae, of 23 species, native to Australia, New Zealand and southern South America.

They are usually small plants, sometimes not reaching more than a few millimeters above the ground, although some form cushions in bolster heaths reaching up to a metre in diameter.

 Species

 Synonyms
 Abrotanella crassipes Skottsb. is synonym of Abrotanella linearifolia A.Gray 
 Abrotanella filiformis Petrie is synonym of Abrotanella linearis Bergg. 
 Rhamphogyne rhynchocarpa was formerly placed here with the name Abrotanella rhynchocarpa

References

Bibliography

 

 Swenson U. 1995. Systematics of Abrotanella, an amphi-Pacific genus of Asteraceae (Senecioneae). Pl. Syst. Evol. 197. (1-4): 149–193.
 Wagstaff, Steven J.; Breitwieser, Ilse & Swenson, Ulf 2006. Origin and relationships of the austral genus Abrotanella (Asteraceae) inferred from DNA sequences. Taxon 55(1):95-106.

External links
 

Asteraceae genera
 
Taxa named by Henri Cassini